A Hero for a Night is a 1927 American silent comedy film directed by William James Craft and produced and distributed by Universal Pictures, cashing in on the "Lindy craze", generated by Charles Lindbergh's famous ocean crossing flight. The film stars Glenn Tryon, Patsy Ruth Miller and Burr McIntosh.

Plot
Hiram Hastings (Glenn Tryon), who drives a taxi at an eastern United States summer resort, wants to become an aviator. He takes a correspondence course in aviation and builds his own aircraft, hoping to enter a race from New York to Europe. Samuel Sloan (Burr McIntosh), a wealthy soap manufacturer, arrives with his daughter Mary (Patsy Ruth Miller), a trained nurse (Ruth Dwyer), and his confidential secretary (Lloyd Whitlock), the last two secretly plotting to get Sloan's holdings.

Hiram, infatuated with Mary, crashes a banquet in honor of a visiting French aviator and takes it upon himself to be the speaker of the evening. Although he is ejected, Hiriam perseveres.

Mary learns of the plot against her father and with the aid of Hiram and his aircraft sets out for New York, but Hiram pilots them across the ocean into Russia and there makes a forced landing. The success of the flight, however, saves the Sloan fortune.

Cast

 Glenn Tryon as Hiram Hastings
 Patsy Ruth Miller as Mary Sloan
 Burr McIntosh as Samuel Sloan
 Lloyd Whitlock as Jack Ferber
 Robert Milasch as Bill Donovan
 Ruth Dwyer as Nurse Mack
 Leo White as Bit part (uncredited)

Production
In the era of Charles Lindbergh's ocean crossing flight, the Curtiss Model D Headless pusher that Glenn Tryon flies, which is depicted in some lobby art, would have been an antique by 1927. The Curtiss "Pusher" was a replica created by Al Wilson for use in air fairs as well in Hollywood features. Several early Curtiss Pushers were still airworthy in 1927 but the rapid advance in aviation made them obsolete especially just prior to World War I and after.

Reception
Aviation historian Michael Paris in From the Wright Brothers to Top Gun: Aviation, Nationalism, and Popular Cinema (1995) described the frenzy of trying to woo Lindbergh to do a film. Hollywood resorted to a spate of aviation-related features including Publicity Madness (1927), Flying Romeos (1928) and  A Hero for a Night, even the Walt Disney Studios' Plane Crazy (1928),  all comedy spoofs of the Lindbergh transatlantic flight.

Aviation film historian Stephen Pendo, in Aviation in the Cinema (1985) noted A Hero for a Night involved "high jinks" in the air. Aviation film historian James Farmer in Celluloid Wings: The Impact of Movies on Aviation (1984) considered A Hero for a Night, a "comedic melodrama."

Preservation status
A Hero for a Night survives and has been released on DVD.

References

Notes

Citations

Bibliography

 Farmer, James H. Celluloid Wings: The Impact of Movies on Aviation (1st ed.). Blue Ridge Summit, Pennsylvania: TAB Books 1984. .
 Paris, Michael. From the Wright Brothers to Top Gun: Aviation, Nationalism, and Popular Cinema. Manchester, UK: Manchester University Press, 1995. .
 Pendo, Stephen. Aviation in the Cinema. Lanham, Maryland: Scarecrow Press, 1985. .
 Wynne, H. Hugh. The Motion Picture Stunt Pilots and Hollywood's Classic Aviation Movies. Missoula, Montana: Pictorial Histories Publishing Co., 1987. .

External links
 
 
 
 Lobby poster
 Dvd of the film

1927 films
American silent feature films
Universal Pictures films
Films directed by William James Craft
American aviation films
American black-and-white films
1927 comedy films
Silent American comedy films
1920s American films
1920s English-language films